Ashok Kumar Yadav is a Nepalese politician. He is a member of Provincial Assembly of Madhesh Province from People's Socialist Party, Nepal. Yadav, a resident of Kabilasi, Sarlahi, was elected via 2017 Nepalese provincial elections from Sarlahi 2(B).

Electoral history

2017 Nepalese provincial elections

References

Living people
1977 births
Madhesi people
21st-century Nepalese politicians
Members of the Provincial Assembly of Madhesh Province
People's Socialist Party, Nepal politicians